The flag of Sri Lanka, also called the Sinha Flag or Lion Flag, consists of a golden lion holding a kastane sword in its right fore-paw in a maroon background with four gold bo leaves, one in each corner. This is bordered by gold, and to its left are two vertical stripes of equal size in teal and orange, with the orange stripe closest to the lion. The lion and the maroon background represent the Sinhalese, while the saffron border and four bo leaves represent concepts of mettā, karuṇā, muditā and upekshā respectively. The stripes represent the country's two largest minorities, with the orange representing the Tamils living in Sri Lanka – both the Sri Lankan Tamils and the Indian Tamils of Sri Lanka – and the green stripe representing the Sri Lankan Moors (Muslims of Sri Lanka). The golden yellow border represents the other minority communities of the country.

History
The symbol of a lion in Sri Lankan heraldry dates back to 486 BC, when Vijaya, the first King of Sri Lanka, arrived on the island from India and brought with him a standard depicting a lion. The symbol appears to have influenced subsequent monarchs, being used extensively by them and becoming a symbol of freedom and hope. As depicted on a mural in Cave no. 2 at Dambulla Viharaya, King Dutugemunu on his campaign against Ellalan- an invading South Indian ruler- in 162 BC is depicted with a banner containing a lion figure carrying a sword in its right forepaw, a symbol of the Sun and one of the Moon. This flag was known as the only ancient representation of the lion flag of the Sinhalese but in 1957, the lion figure on it was defaced by a vandal.

This basic design continued to be in use until 1815, when the Kandyan Convention ended the reign of the country's last native monarch, Sri Vikrama Rajasinha, replacing his royal standard (used as the Flag of the Kingdom of Kandy) with the Union Flag as the nation's accepted flag. The government of British Ceylon later established its own flag, while Sri Vikrama Rajasinha's standard was taken to England and kept at the Royal Hospital Chelsea.

As the independence movement in Sri Lanka gained strength in the early 20th century, E. W. Perera and D. R. Wijewardena discovered the original Lioness Flag in Chelsea. A photo of it was published in Dinamina, in a special edition marking a century since the loss of self-rule and Sri Lankan independence. The flag provoked much interest from the public who, for the first time since the fall of the Kandyan Kingdom, had seen its actual design.

Member of Parliament for Batticaloa, Mudaliyar A. Sinnalebbe, suggested in Parliament on January 16, 1948, that the Lion Flag should be accepted as the national flag. In 1948, the flag was adopted as the national flag of the Dominion of Ceylon, undergoing two changes: one in 1953 and a redesign in 1972. A notable feature of 1972's adaptation of the Kandyan standard was the replacement of the four spearheads at the flag's corners by four bo leaves, a design choice made under the direction of Nissanka Wijeyeratne, Permanent Secretary to the Ministry of Cultural Affairs and Chairman of the National Emblem and Flag Design Committee.

Monarchical Sri Lanka

British Ceylon period

Sri Lanka (since 1948)

Symbolism
The national flag of Sri Lanka represents the country and its heritage as a rallying device. Most symbols in the flag have been given distinctive meanings.

Colours
The colors of the national flag are specified in the document "SLS 1: 2020: Specification for the National Flag of the Democratic Socialist Republic of Sri Lanka".

Gallery

See also

List of Sri Lankan flags
Emblem of Sri Lanka
Flag of Veneto

References

Citations

Sources 

Lanka Library
The Proposer of the lion Flag, Mudaliyar Sinnalebbe
Sri Lanka Government Web Portal
The Sri Lankan Lion Flag -how it came to be

External links

A few examples of European Heraldic Lions and the Sri Lankan national flag
 
Lion Flag as depicted in the Constitution of Sri Lanka

 
National symbols of Sri Lanka
Flags displaying animals
Flags introduced in 1948
Flags introduced in 1972